Ethmia yunnanensis is a moth in the family Depressariidae. It was described by You-Qiao Liu in 1980. It is found in Yunnan, China.

References

Moths described in 1980
yunnanensis